Phanera scandens is a species of 'monkey ladder' lianas in the subfamily Cercidoideae and the tribe Bauhinieae, the genus having been separated from Bauhinia and the discontinued genus Lasiobema (possibly placed as a section).  Under its synonym, Bauhinia scandens, records exist from the Indian subcontinent, Indo-China and Malesia.  Under the name Bauhinia scandens var. horsfieldii its Vietnamese name is móng bò leo.

Gallery

References

External links

Cercidoideae
Flora of tropical Asia
Fabales of Asia